Holy Roman Church, Roman Church, Church of Rome or Church in Rome may refer to:
 The Diocese of Rome or the Holy See
 The Latin Church
 Churches of Rome (buildings)

In historical contexts Roman Church may also refer to:
 The Catholic Church (also known as the Roman Catholic Church)
 The first Christians in Rome
 The State church of the Roman Empire
 The church of the Holy Roman Empire